Emamzadeh Abdallah (also Romanized as Emāmzādeh ʿAbdāllah) is a village in Hendijan-e Sharqi Rural District, in the Central District of Hendijan County, Khuzestan Province, Iran. At the 2006 census, its population was 708, in 151 families.

References 

Populated places in Hendijan County